Dziuba or Dzyuba (Belarusian, Russian and Ukrainian: Дзюба) is a surname of Polish, Belarusian and Ukrainian origins. It may refer to:

 Artyom Dzyuba (born 1988), Russian footballer
 Brygida Dziuba (born 1939), Polish gymnast
 Igor Dzyuba (born 1972), Soviet cyclist
 Igor Dziuba (born 1983), Ukrainian speed skater
 Irina Dzyuba (born 1980), Russian gymnast
 Ivan Dziuba (born 1931), Ukrainian writer
 Maria Dziuba (born 1945), Polish politician
 Marcin Dziuba (born 1983), Polish chess player
 Marek Dziuba (born 1955), Polish footballer
 Roman Dzyuba (born 1979), Ukrainian Paralympic athlete
 Viktor Dzyuba (born 1977), Russian politician

References

See also
 
 

Belarusian-language surnames
Polish-language surnames
Ukrainian-language surnames